The 2003 Bob Jane T-Marts 1000 was a motor race for V8 Supercars held on 12 October 2003 at the Mount Panorama Circuit just outside Bathurst, New South Wales, Australia. It was the seventh running of the Australia 1000 race, first held after the organisational split over the Bathurst 1000 that occurred in 1997. It was the 46th race that traces its lineage back to the 1960 Armstrong 500 held at Phillip Island. The race was the tenth round of the 2003 V8 Supercar Championship Series.

The race was won by Greg Murphy and Rick Kelly driving a K-Mart Racing Team run Holden Commodore (VY). It was the fifth consecutive victory for Holden, a new record. It was Murphy's third victory in the race and Kelly became the youngest driver to win the race, eclipsing the previous record set by Craig Lowndes in 1996.

On Saturday, Murphy also recorded what was then the fastest lap in the circuit's history to take pole position during the Top 10 Shootout. The time stood as the fastest ever in a V8 Supercar for 7 years until Craig Lowndes lapped barely a few hundredths faster in practice during the 2010 event, although neither are officially recognised as the lap record as only race laps contribute to lap records.

Entry List

Practice

Qualifying

Qualifying

Top 10 Shootout

* Greg Murphy became the first New Zealand born driver to actually set pole position for the Bathurst 1000. Murphy and fellow Kiwi racers Jim Richards and Paul Radisich had previously been on pole position for the race, but on each of those occasions it was their Australian co-driver who had set the pole winning time. Murphy's time of 2:06.8594 was the first time a touring car had gone under 2:07.00 for a lap of the 6.213 km (3.861 mi) circuit and was unofficially dubbed the "Lap of the Gods".* Larry Perkins crashed the #11 Castrol Perkins Racing Holden Commodore (VY) during Practice 4, with the damage substantial enough to rule it out for the Top 10 Shootout.

Starting grid
The following table represents the final starting grid for the race on Sunday:

Race results

Statistics
 Provisional Pole Position - #51 Greg Murphy - 2:07.9503
 Pole Position - #51 Greg Murphy - 2:06.8594
 Fastest Lap - #34 Garth Tander - 2:08.6726 (new lap record)
 Race time of winning car - 6:32:55.4044
 Average speed of winning car - 153 km/h

References

External links
 Official race results at racing.natsoft.com.au
 Official V8 Supercar website at 20 November 2003 via web.archive.org
 2003 Bathurst 1000 image gallery at www.motorsport.com

Bob Jane T-Marts 1000
Motorsport in Bathurst, New South Wales